TassDB (TAndem Splice Site DataBase) is a database of tandem splice sites of eight species

See also
 Alternative splicing

References

External links
 https://archive.today/20070106023527/http://helios.informatik.uni-freiburg.de/TassDB/.

Genetics databases
Gene expression
Spliceosome
RNA splicing